USS Nelansu (SP-610) was a United States Navy patrol vessel in commission from 1917 to 1918.

Nelansu was built as a private motorboat by R. Bigelow at Monument Beach, Massachusetts. Some sources say her original name was U. S. Kent, while others state that this only was a possibility, but all agree that she was named Nelansu by 1917.

In 1917, the U.S. Navy acquired her under a free lease from her owner, John S. Kent, for use as a section patrol boat during World War I, and she was commissioned as USS Nelansu (SP-610).  Sources disagree on the timing of these events, claiming acquisition dates of both 26 May and 20 July 1917; the only source to provide a commissioning date places it on 26 May 1917.

Assigned to the 1st Naval District in northern New England, Kiowa carried out patrol duties in the Boston, Massachusetts, area for the rest of World War I.

Nelansu was decommissioned on 30 November 1918 and returned to Kent the same day.

Notes

References

Department of the Navy Naval History and Heritage Command Online Library of Selected Images: Civilian Ships: Nelansu (Motor Boat, 1909). Possibly previously named U.S. Kent. Served as USS Nelansu (SP-610) in 1917–1918
NavSource Online: Section Patrol Craft Photo Archive Nelansu (SP 610)

Patrol vessels of the United States Navy
World War I patrol vessels of the United States
Ships built in Massachusetts
1917 ships